Copacabana Municipality may refer to:
 Copacabana Municipality, La Paz, Bolivia
 Copacabana, Antioquia, Colombia

Municipality name disambiguation pages